San Giacomo degli Italiani (once the church of San Giacomo dei Pisani) is a church located on Via Depretis in Naples, Italy.

First built in 1238, in the Swabian era, and given in gratitude to merchants from the Republic of Pisa, who had recently been victorious in a battle against a Saracen navy. At the beginning of the 15th century the church was turned over to the knights of the Order of the Spade (Ordine della Spada). Subsequently circa 1575, the church and the order of the Spada was forbidden to carry out their investitures by the viceroy Íñigo López de Hurtado de Mendoza, and the ceremonies were moved to the San Giacomo degli Spagnoli. 

In 1775, the church was granted to the Complementari, who restored the church in a Baroque style. The present church of San Giacomo was reconstructed by reopening an alternative older portal, surmounted by a coat of arms of a shell with crossed swords. Due to the damage from the bombardment of 1943 and the Irpinia earthquake of 1980, the building is not longer consecrated, and used for temporary art exhibitions. The interior artwork has been moved elsewhere.

Bibliography
Francesco Ceva Grimaldi, Della città di Napoli dal tempo della sua fondazione sino al presente, Naples 1857.
Carlo Celano - G.B.Chiarini, Notizie del bello dell'antico e del curioso della città di Napoli Volume IV, Naples 1859.
Gaetano Nobile, Un mese a Napoli - Descrizione della città di Napoli e delle sue vicinanze Volume II, Naples 1860.
Giancarlo Alisio, Napoli e il Risanamento. Recupero di una structure urbana, E.S.I. Naples 1980.
Gennaro Aspreno Galante, Le Chiese di Napoli. Guida Sacra della Città di Napoli, Fibreno 1872.

See also

Santa Barbara dei Cannonieri, Naples

References

External links
Photo of the church

Former churches in Naples
18th-century Roman Catholic church buildings in Italy
Baroque architecture in Naples
Roman Catholic churches completed in 1775